Gwynne Shotwell ( Rowley; born November 23, 1963) is an American businesswoman and engineer. She is the president and chief operating officer of SpaceX, an American space transportation company, where she is responsible for day-to-day operations and company growth.

, Shotwell is listed as the 31st most powerful woman in the world by Forbes. In 2020, she was included on Times list of the 100 most influential people in the world.

Early life
Shotwell was born in Evanston, Illinois, as the middle of three daughters to a brain surgeon and an artist, and was raised in Libertyville, Illinois. In 1982, she graduated from Libertyville High School. In 1969, she watched a television broadcast of the Apollo 11 mission with her family, but remembers finding it "boring" and was not interested in space at the time. Shotwell excelled in both academics and athletics in high school, where she was on the cheerleading and Varsity basketball teams while achieving at the top of her class. Her interests changed during high school after her mother took her to a panel discussion at the Illinois Institute of Technology by the Society of Women Engineers, where a mechanical engineer in particular inspired Shotwell to become an engineer. Following this, she decided to apply to Northwestern University, where she received a Bachelor of Science in mechanical engineering, and later a Master of Science degree in applied mathematics.

Career
At the beginning of her career, Shotwell had an interview with IBM on the day of the Space Shuttle Challenger disaster, which disturbed her and she did not get a job offer. Instead, Shotwell took a job in the automotive industry at Chrysler Corporation's management training program, which she initially enjoyed but later grew tired of and left to return to Northwestern for her graduate degree.

In 1988, Shotwell began work at the El Segundo research center of The Aerospace Corporation, and did technical work on military space research and development contracts. An early project she worked on was STS-39. During a ten-year tenure, she worked in thermal analysis. Shotwell worked in both space systems engineering and project management positions.

She left The Aerospace Corporation in 1998 to become director of the space systems division at Microcosm Inc. There, she served on the executive committee and was responsible for business development.

Shotwell left Microcosm in 2002 to join SpaceX, a private, commercial, space exploration company founded by Elon Musk in the same year. She convinced Musk that SpaceX should hire a dedicated employee to work on business development full-time during a visit to the company, but had not planned to join the company herself. Shotwell took the job two weeks later. In December 2008, Shotwell was promoted to company president following her role in the successful negotiation of the first Commercial Resupply Services contract with the NASA Administrator (and former SpaceX contractor) Mike Griffin. This followed SpaceX's first successful launch of the Falcon 1 on its fourth attempt earlier in the year. She was responsible for leading the effort on building the Falcon Vehicle manifest to over 50 launches, generating $5 billion in revenue. This included a commercial connection to the International Space Station for resupplying services, where they were able to deliver cargo and supplies to the astronauts. Shotwell is currently the President and COO of SpaceX, responsible for day-to-day operations and managing all customer and strategic relations to support company growth.

She oversaw the first landing of an orbital rocket's first stage on land and on an ocean platform, the first relaunch and landing of a used orbital rocket, the first controlled flyback and recovery of a payload fairing, and the first re-flight of a commercial cargo spacecraft. SpaceX has a multibillion-dollar contract with NASA to deliver astronauts and science instruments to the International Space Station. On May 30, 2020, SpaceX became the first private company to launch two astronauts to Earth orbit.

On February 6, 2019, Polaris Industries announced that Shotwell would join their board of directors on March 1, 2019.

Shotwell has served on the California Space Authority Board of Directors and its executive committee after she was elected in 2004. She has served as an officer on the AIAA Space Systems Technical Committee and participates in a variety of STEM related programs. She led a committee that raised over $350,000 in scholarships for the Frank J. Redd Student Competition over 6 years.

Public outreach
Shotwell gave a TEDx Talk at TEDxChapmanU in June 2013 on the importance of science, technology, engineering, and mathematics. She speaks regularly to business audiences and gave a talk for the "Captains of Industry" series at the Brent Scowcroft Center on International Security in June 2014 on private entrepreneurial accomplishments in advancing spaceflight technology.

At the 2018 TED conference, Shotwell was interviewed by Chris Anderson about the future plans of SpaceX.

At the Grace Hopper Celebration of Women in Computing on September 28, 2018, Shotwell's talk was titled "Launching Our Future" and she discussed her vision and advancements for aerospace technology, as well as why diversity and the inclusion of women are necessary to advance as a society.

Personal life 
Shotwell is married to Robert Shotwell, an engineer at NASA’s Jet Propulsion Laboratory. She has two children from her first marriage to Leon Gurevich.

Honors and awards 
 2012: Women in Technology International Hall of Fame
 2017: Satellite Executive of the Year
 2018: Forbes' America's Top 50 Women In Tech
 2020: Time 100 most influential people
 2020: Satellite Executive of the Year
 2020: Elected a member of the National Academy of Engineering in 2020 for bringing affordable, commercially competitive space transportation to NASA and the US National Security Space Launch.

References

External links 

 

1963 births
Living people
American aerospace businesspeople
American aerospace engineers
American mechanical engineers
American women business executives
American women engineers
American chief operating officers
Robert R. McCormick School of Engineering and Applied Science alumni
SpaceX people